Ophiusa tumiditermina  is a moth of the family Erebidae. It is found in Africa, including South Africa, Zambia and Príncipe.

References

Ophiusa
Fauna of Zambia
Moths of Africa
Moths described in 1910